This is a list of Canadian divisions in World War II:

 1st Canadian Infantry Division
 2nd Canadian Infantry Division
 3rd Canadian Infantry Division
 3rd Canadian Infantry Division (CAOF)
 4th Canadian (Armoured) Division
 5th Canadian (Armoured) Division
 6th Canadian Infantry Division
 6th Canadian Infantry Division (CAPF)
 7th Canadian Infantry Division
 8th Canadian Infantry Division

See also
List of Canadian divisions in World War I
 List of British Empire divisions in the Second World War

World War II
Divisions in World War II
Canadian Divisions
 
Divisions World War II
Canada, World War II